Giannis Rizos (born 19 March 2002) is a Greek professional footballer who plays as a left-back for Super League 2 club Thesprotos, on loan from PAS Giannina.

References

2002 births
Living people
Greek footballers
Super League Greece players
Super League Greece 2 players
PAS Giannina F.C. players
Thesprotos F.C. players
Association football defenders
Footballers from Ioannina